Ariel is a given name from Biblical Hebrew  Ariel that literally means "lion of God". In modern Hebrew, Ariel is primarily used as a male name. However, in recent years in English-speaking countries, it has been more commonly used as a female name. It also appears as a surname.

Common short forms of Ariel are Ari and Arik for boys (primarily in Hebrew-speaking areas), and Arie, Elle, and Ella for girls (primarily in English and French-speaking areas).

List of people with the given name Ariel 

 Ariel Behar (born 1989), Uruguayan tennis player
 Ariel Bloomer (born 1988), singer for American rock band Icon for Hire
 Ariel Borysiuk (born 1991), Polish footballer playing as a defensive midfielder
 Ariel Serena Hedges Bowen (1862–1904), American writer and activist
 Ariel Bybee (born 1943), American singer
 Ariel Castro (1960–2013), former bus driver and convicted kidnapper of three women
 Ariel Dorfman (born 1942), Chilean-American writer
 Ariel Durant (1898–1981), American historian
 Ariel Gade (born 1997), American actress
 Ariel Garten (born 1979), Canadian artist, scientist, and co-founder of InteraXon
 Ariel Gore (born 1970), American writer
 Ariel Helwani (born 1982), Canadian journalist
 Nazril Irham (born 1981), Indonesian singer using the mononym "Ariel"
 Ariel Kaplan (born 1994), Australian actress
 Ariel King, American health policy consultant
 Ariel Leve (born 1968), British journalist
 Ariel Levy (born 1974), American journalist
 Ariel Lin (born 1982), Taiwanese actress and singer
 Shelly Martinez (born 1980), American former professional wrestler who performed under the ring name "Ariel"
 Ariel McDonald (born 1972), American-Slovenian basketball player; 2000 Israeli Basketball Premier League MVP
 Ariel Meredith (born 1986), American model
 Ariel Muzicant (born 1952), Austrian Jewish community leader
 Ariel Nahuelpan (born 1987), Argentinian soccer player
 Ariel Ortega (born 1974), Argentinian soccer player
 Ariel Pestano (born 1974), Cuban baseball player
 Ariel Pink (born 1978), American musician
 Ariel Porat (born 1956), Israeli jurist and academic
 Ariel Ramírez (1921–2010), Argentine composer and pianist
 Ariel Rios (1954–1982), American ATF agent
 Ariel Rivera (born 1966), Filipino singer and actor
 Ana Rocha (born 1984), American professional wrestler who uses the ring name Ariel
 Ariel Schulman (born 1981), American actor, film director, and producer
 Ariel Sharon (1928–2014), Israeli military officer and politician, Prime Minister from 2001 to 2006
 Ariel Ureta (born 1946), Filipino actor, host and comedian
 Ariel Vromen (born 1973), Israeli film director and screenwriter
 Ariel Winter (born 1998), American actress
 Ariel Ze'evi (born 1977), Israeli judoka

List of people with the surname Ariel
 Adam Ariel (born 1994), Israeli basketball player in the Israel Basketball Premier League
 Gideon Ariel (born 1939), Israeli former Olympian in the shot put and discus throw
 Meir Ariel (1942–1999), Israeli singer-songwriter
 Uri Ariel (born 1952), Israeli politician

Fictional characters 

 Ariel (The Tempest), a sylph, a character in William Shakespeare's play The Tempest
 Ariel, an evil angel and pagan god in John Milton's Paradise Lost
 Ariel, a sylph, the protector of Belinda in Alexander Pope's The Rape of the Lock
 Ariel Moore, a character in the 1984 movie Footloose
 Ariel (The Little Mermaid), the title character of Disney's 1989 film The Little Mermaid
 Ariel, a recurring character in the ABC television series Once Upon a Time
 Ariel Manto, the protagonist of The End of Mr. Y by Scarlett Thomas
 Ariel Maloney, a character in the movie Soapdish
 Ariel Hawksquill, a mage in John Crowley's epic Little, Big
 Ariel Schiller, a character in the 2007 movie Starting Out in the Evening
 Ariel Truax, a character in the movie Grumpy Old Men
 Detective Ariel, one of two police inspectors on the case of a triple child murder in Martin McDonagh's The Pillowman
 Ari Gold (Entourage) a character in the HBO series Entourage
 Ariel DuBois, a character in the NBC drama Medium
 Ariel (Robotech), a character in the science fiction series Robotech
 Ariel (comics), a fictional character in the Marvel Comics Universe
 Ariel, alias of the Marvel Comics character Kitty Pryde
 Princess Ariel (Thundarr the Barbarian), a main character in the Thundarr the Barbarian animated series
 Ariel Kyho (吳彩欣), a character in the TVB television drama A Kindred Spirit
 Ariel (Legacy of Kain), a character in the Legacy of Kain video game series
 Ariel Sullivan, a character in the movie In America
 Ariel, a character in the ABC Family mini-series Fallen
 Ariel, the hero of the concept albums Epica and The Black Halo by American power metal band Kamelot
 Ariel, the prime antagonist in Isobelle Carmody's fantasy series The Obernewtyn Chronicles
 Ariel Wolfe, a character in the movie Return to House on Haunted Hill
 Ariel, Mage Queen of Loren, the semi-divine queen of the Wood Elves in the Warhammer tabletop wargame setting
 Ariel, a unicorn in Steve Boyett's novel Ariel
 Ariel Alderman, third season antagonist on the Nip/Tuck television series
 Ariel Kirkwood, a character in the novel Truly, Madly Manhattan by Nora Roberts
 Ariel Aldrin, a character in the daytime television series As the World Turns from 1982 to 1985
 Ariel, a character in the first-season episode "Angel One" of the television series Star Trek: The Next Generation
 Ariel Hunter, a character in the 1994–95 season of the television series Beverly Hills, 90210
 Demon Lord Ariel from the light novel series So I'm a Spider, So What?
 Ariel, secondary protagonist of the 2018 movie Maquia: When the Promised Flower Blooms

See also
 Ariel (angel), an angel in Judaism, Christianity (Gnostic) and occult lore
 Ariel (disambiguation)
 Arielle (given name)

English feminine given names
English unisex given names
English-language unisex given names
Jewish given names
Hebrew-language names
Given names of Hebrew language origin
Theophoric names
Masculine given names
Feminine given names